Benedictine College Preparatory is a private Roman Catholic military high school in Goochland, Virginia.  It is owned and operated by the Benedictine Society of Virginia, part of the American-Cassinese Congregation. Benedictine offers education through a private military institute model, which has long been a traditional form of education for young men in Virginia.

History
Benedictine College Preparatory was founded in 1911 with 29 students, under the name of Benedictine College, by a group of Benedictine monks from Belmont Abbey in North Carolina. Seeking to continue the work of their founder by establishing learning and culture, they came to Richmond to establish a Catholic high school for boys. They adopted the successful and prestigious military academy type model, which also meshed well with the monastic life of the monks. The order, discipline, and hierarchy of the military are very much analogous to the structures in the monastery and the Church. The aim was, and continues to be, to form young men in body and soul—to nourish a love of Truth, foster the life of virtue, and promote a healthy life.

In 2009, the school board was dissolved and Headmaster John McGinty was ousted by a vote of 11 senior monks of Mary Mother of the Church Abbey. Fr. Gregory Gresko, OSB, the second-in-charge of the abbey, said that McGinty's contract was not renewed for financial reasons. The school, whose enrollment under McGinty had risen to 267, was under financial stress and running on a deficit. Gresko took on the position of temporary headmaster, saying that having a Benedictine in a leadership position after years of absence was "returning to our roots."

On August 1, 2011, Benedictine High School changed its name to Benedictine College Preparatory "to reflect the school’s goal to become more academically rigorous."

In April 2011, Benedictine announced that it was selling the school's historic campus on Sheppard Street in Richmond's Museum District to the Catholic Diocese of Richmond Later on, they planned to move forward with plans to move the school to Goochland, Virginia. The sale included a buy-back option for the school in case the plans to move the school fell through.

In the fall of the 2013-2014 semester, Benedictine College Preparatory moved to the Mary Mother of the Church Abbey location and the sale of the Sheppard Street campus was finalized. The campus was sold to the Catholic Diocese of Richmond, though Benedictine still plays home basketball games and hosts a number of events at the historic Memorial Gymnasium. The sale to the Diocese allowed for continued parking at the church during Sunday mass at the adjacently located St. Benedict's Parish, which was a continuation of a preexisting arrangement with the Parish. This also allowed for the renovation of the Mary Mother of the Church Abbey campus, which formerly served as home to St. John Vianney Seminary, for reinstalled educational use. Mary Mother of the Church Abbey is located in Goochland County and the school received backlash from some local residents and several alumni for the desire to sell the historic Sheppard Street campus and move so far from the urban campus that was the school's home for 100 years. The sale of the Shepard Street campus was estimated to be around $5.5 million and was used to renovate the Abbey campus, as well as to build additional facilities for the students at the new campus.

Leadership

Student life
All students at Benedictine participate in the school's military leadership program. The students are known as the Corps of Cadets, and this inspired the school's athletic nickname: the Cadets. From the school's founding in 1911 through the late 1960s, the school employed a private military institute model and was not affiliated with any branch of the United States Armed Forces. Beginning in the 1960s, Benedictine adopted the U.S. Army JROTC program, which continued at the school until 2016. The JROTC program at Benedictine held the highest rating given by the U.S. Army – Honor Unit with Distinction – which allowed the school to nominate directly a student for appointment to a service academy or for an ROTC scholarship. Many Cadets have used this honor and attended the service academies and other military colleges (most notably Virginia Military Institute) to further their education. In 2016, Benedictine discontinued longstanding relationship with the U.S. Army JROTC program and returned to the private military institute model, however it is still modeled after the U.S Army. The military leadership program at Benedictine offers students the opportunity to participate in a number of activities including the Drill Team, Rifle Team, and the Pipe and Drum Corps, as well as the opportunity to hold leadership positions as cadet non-commissioned officers and cadet officers throughout the Corps.

Benedictine also offers a number of other clubs and organizations including a "Battle of the Brains" Quiz Bowl team, the National Honor Society, Model General Assembly, Model Judiciary, Student Council, Spanish Club, Latin Club, Key Club, Emmaus Group, RAMPS Community Service Club, Rugby Club, Fishing Club, and the Cadet Choir. The school also has a joint Drama Club with its sister school, St. Gertrude High School, hosts a number of military balls throughout the year, and puts on an annual Benedictine Art Show that showcases works by current Cadets.

Athletics 

Cadets basketball

Warren Rutledge was head coach of the Cadets for 43 years and amassed 949 total wins, making him the winningest high school coach in Virginia and eleventh in the nation. The Benedictine basketball program has won 25 Virginia State Catholic titles from 1959, 1961, 1964, 1965, 1967, 1968, 1970 through 1985, 1994, 1999, 2000 and 2003. The Cadets also hold five VISAA State Championships for Boys' Basketball for the 2003, 2007, 2008, 2011, and 2013 seasons. Since the early 1950s the Cadets have played home games on "Coach Rut Court" in the Memorial Gymnasium on the now former Benedictine campus. For three seasons, from 1951 to 1954, Benedictine's Memorial Gymnasium served as host to the University of Richmond's basketball team, before the opening of Richmond Arena. Also, since 1966 Benedictine has hosted an annual holiday boys' basketball tournament, the Benedictine Capital City Classic.

Cadets football

The football program won the VISAA Division III Championship in 2000 and 2001 and the VISAA Division I Championship in the 2014–2015,2015-2016 and 2019–2020 seasons. The Cadets football team plays its home games at Bobby Ross Stadium which is located at the Mary Mother of the Church Abbey campus in front of the main academic building and chapel.

Cadets wrestling

The Benedictine wrestling program won four consecutive VISAA State Championships in 2014, 2015, 2016, and 2017, and the team finished as State Runner-up in 2018 and 2019.

Other sports

The Cadets have earned VISAA State Championships in the following sports as well:

Baseball – 2000, 2010, 2017, 2019 (2010, 2017, and 2019);
Cross Country – 1980;
Soccer – 2001 & 2006

Benedictine also fields  teams in lacrosse, golf, tennis, indoor & outdoor track & field, rugby, swimming, and fishing. Rather than do traditional fundraising methods, each year Benedictine hosts an athletic event known as the Benedictine Boxing Smoker which features several bouts of collegiate boxing and has included teams such as the Virginia Military Institute, Penn State, University of Maryland, Georgetown University, the University of North Carolina, East Carolina University, and Wake Forest University, among others. Also notably, ex professional WWE wrestler Rick "Nature Boy" Flair had a match at the boxing smoker.

Prominent graduates of the Benedictine athletic program include 2016 Olympic Gold Medalist swimmer Townley Haas, college and NFL Head Coach Bobby Ross, former NBA Head Coach John Kuester, former NFL offensive lineman Patrick Estes, NFL defensive linemen Nigel Williams & Clelin Ferrell, 2019 NFL 1st round draft pick (#4) by the Oakland Raiders(now Las Vegas Raiders), NBA forward Ed Davis, and NBA guard Michael Gbinije.

Athletic directors

Notable alumni
 Steve Bannon, the former White House Chief Strategist in the Trump administration.
 Townley Haas, American swimmer, who won gold during the 4 × 200 metre freestyle at the 2016 Rio Olympics.
Bobby Ross, former college and NFL coach.
Joseph R. Swedish, CEO of Anthem Inc.
Thomas J. Bliley Jr., former U.S. Representative
John Kuester, former American basketball coach and scout
Mark Crow, former American basketball player
Ed Davis,  current professional basketball player for the Utah Jazz.
Clelin Ferrell, current NFL player for the Las Vegas Raiders.
Michael Gbinije, current professional basketball player, formerly with the Detroit Pistons.
Patrick Estes, former NFL player for the San Francisco 49ers.
Tracy Woodson, former MLB player and current head coach at the University of Richmond. 
Granny Hamner, former MLB player for the Philadelphia Phillies.

Gallery

See also
 Bishop Ireton High School – Formerly an all-boys' school in Virginia

Notes and references

External links

 

Benedictine secondary schools
Catholic secondary schools in Virginia
Educational institutions established in 1911
Boys' schools in the United States
High schools in Richmond, Virginia
Historic district contributing properties in Virginia
Roman Catholic Diocese of Richmond
Military high schools in the United States
National Register of Historic Places in Richmond, Virginia
1911 establishments in Virginia